Kalle is a village in Dharwad district of Karnataka, India.

Demographics 
As of the 2011 Census of India there were 175 households in Kalle and a total population of 953 consisting of 508 males and 445 females. There were 125 children ages 0-6.

References

Villages in Dharwad district